Kuşçukuru is a village in the Beşiri District of Batman Province in Turkey. The village is populated by Kurds of the Reşkotan tribe and had a population of 147 in 2021. The village is populated by Yazidis.

The hamlets of Ekinciler and Mezelkan are attached to the village. Ekinciler is also populated by Yazidis.

References 

Villages in Beşiri District
Kurdish settlements in Batman Province
Yazidi villages in Turkey